Mobilization is the act of assembling and readying military troops and supplies for war.

Mobilization can also refer to:
Community mobilization, an attempt to bring both human and non-human resources together to undertake developmental activities
Joint mobilization, a type of passive movement of a skeletal joint
Mass mobilization (also known as social or popular mobilization), a social science theory related to mobilizing the population in mass meetings, parades, and other gatherings
Resource mobilization, a social science theory related to mass mobilization in the social movements context
Mobilization: The International Quarterly Review of Social Movement Research, an academic journal

See also
Mobilization Device, an award associated with the U.S. Armed Forces Reserve Medal
National Mobilization Committee to End the War in Vietnam